Thomas Haldenwang (born 21 May 1960) is a German lawyer and the president of the German Federal Office for the Protection of the Constitution (Bundesamt für Verfassungsschutz).

Biography
Haldenwang was born in 1960 in Wuppertal and studied law at the University of Marburg.

Since November 2018 Haldenwang has been the president of the Bundesamt für Verfassungsschutz, a German intelligence agency with the mission to fight extremist adversaries of the federal constitution.

BfV-presidency 
After his appointment, he announced an increased focus of the BfV on right-wing extremism. The number of employees in this phenomenon area should be increased from 200 to 300. 

In the murder case of Walter Lübcke, Haldenwang said that one might also have to assume a scenario of "sleepers" in the field of right-wing extremism – similar to that in the field of Islamism – and adapt accordingly to it. By classifying the AfD group Der Flügel as a "secured right-wing extremist aspiration", he is said to have become the enemy image of right-wing extremists, according to Der Spiegel.

Haldenwang pointed out from 2021 that the anti-corona movement will become smaller, but more radical.  "With violence-oriented right-wing extremists and in the radicalized corona protest milieu, no scenario can be ruled out," he said in January 2022. According to Haldenwang, there is "selective and in some regions a formative influence by right-wing extremists."

References

1960 births
Living people
21st-century German civil servants
People from Wuppertal
University of Marburg alumni